"Lose Control" is a song recorded by Canadian pop rock band Hedley for their sixth studio album Hello (2015). It was written by lead singer Jacob Hoggard with Jarett Holmes, Brian Howes, and Jason "JVP" Van Poederooyen, and was produced by all but Holmes. "Lose Control" was released March 4, 2016 through Universal Music Canada as the album's third official single.

"Lose Control" reached a moderate peak of 37 on the Canadian Hot 100, providing the band their second consecutive top-40 single off Hello, and also reached the top 20 on two airplay formats. In September 2016, it was certified Platinum by Music Canada.

Commercial reception
"Hello" debuted at number 89 on the Billboard Canadian Hot 100 chart dated April 16, 2016. The song peaked at number 37 on the Canadian Hot 100 chart dated July 30, 2016. "Lose Control" peaked at numbers 21, 10, and 7, respectively, on the Canada AC, Canada CHR/Top 40, and Canada Hot AC airplay charts. In September 2016, "Lose Control" was certified Platinum by Music Canada, indicating sales of over 100,000.

Music video
A video for "Lose Control" was directed by Lisa Mann, Samy Inayeh and premiered March 21, 2016. Compared to the video for Taylor Swift's 2014 hit "Shake It Off", the video finds the members of Hedley surrounded by female dancers who use the men as props in their ballet-style performances.

Live performances
The band performed "Lose Control" on June 19, 2016 at the 2016 iHeartRadio Much Music Video Awards.

Awards and nominations

Credits and personnel
Credits adapted from Hello album liner notes.

Recording
 Recorded and mixed at Van Howes Studio (Studio City, CA)
 Mastered at Sterling Sound (New York City, NY)

Personnel
 Vocals – Jacob Hoggard
 Background vocals – Chris Crippin, Brian Howes, Tommy Mac, Dave Rosin
 Guitars – Jacob Hoggard, Brian Howes, Dave Rosin
 Bass – Tommy Mac
 Drums – Chris Crippin
 Piano – Jacob Hoggard
 Keyboards – Jacob Hoggard, Jason "JVP" Van Poederooyen
 Programming – Jacob Hoggard, Jason "JVP" Van Poederooyen
 Percussion – Jacob Hoggard
 Production – Jacob Hoggard, Brian Howes, Jason "JVP" Van Poederooyen
 Songwriting – Jacob Hoggard, Jarett Holmes, Brian Howes, Jason "JVP" Van Poederooyen

Chart performance

Weekly charts

Year-end charts

Certifications and sales

References

2015 songs
2016 singles
Hedley (band) songs
Universal Music Group singles
Songs written by Jacob Hoggard
Songs written by Brian Howes